Mudrika Singh Yadav was a senior most leader of the Rashtriya Janata Dal from Bihar. He was the Principal General Secretary of RJD. He had served in the Lalu Prasad Yadav ministry as Health minister. He was elected to Bihar Vidhan Sabha from Jehanabad in 2015 as a member of Rashtriya Janata Dal and from Kurtha as a member of Janata Dal in 1990. Yadav died on 24 October 2017 due to a head injury as well as dengue in Patna.

References
 https://www.outlookindia.com/newsscroll/rjd-mla-mundrika-singh-yadav-passes-away/1173577
 https://www.indiatoday.in/india/story/lalu-prasad-tej-pratap-yadav-nitish-mundrika-singh-yadav-1070559-2017-10-25
 https://timesofindia.indiatimes.com/topic/Mundrika-Singh-Yadav
 https://www.patnadaily.com/index.php/news/13002-rjd-legislator-mundrika-singh-yadav-passes-away.html

Rashtriya Janata Dal politicians
Bihari politicians
Corruption in Bihar
Year of birth missing
2017 deaths
People from Jehanabad district
Members of the Bihar Legislative Assembly
People from Arwal district